Byns enda blondin is a 1994 Sven-Ingvars studio album.

Track listing

Charts

References 

1994 albums
Sven-Ingvars albums